Chávez (Spanish) or Chavez may refer to:

People 
 Chávez (surname), including:
 Hugo Chávez (1954–2013), president of Venezuela in office from 1999 to 2013
 César Chávez (1927–1993), American labor leader and civil rights activist

Entertainment
Chavez (band), an indie rock band in New York in the 1990s
Cesar Chavez (film), 2014 Mexican-American film

Games
Chavez, the Spanish-language version of Riddick Bowe Boxing released in Mexico
Chavez II, the Spanish-language version of Boxing Legends of the Ring released in Mexico

Places 
 Colegio Cesar Chavez, a defunct college named after César Chávez, operating from 1973 until 1983

See also
Chaves (disambiguation)

ko:차베스